Rhodambulyx davidi is a species of moth of the family Sphingidae. It is known from the mountains of southern China, where it is found at altitudes between 1,200 and 2,300 meters.

References

Smerinthini
Moths described in 1939